Joseph D’Lacey is a British author, known for his science fiction, fantasy and horror stories, many of which have environmental themes. In 2008, his first published novel, MEAT, gained him the British Fantasy Award for Best Newcomer.

He currently resides in Northamptonshire with his wife and daughter.

Bibliography

Novels

The Black Dawn
Black Feathers (2013)
The Book of the Crowman (2014)

Others
MEAT (2008)
Garbage Man (2009)
The Kill Crew (2009)
Snake Eyes (2012)
Blood Fugue (2012)
Roadkill (2013)
The Veil: Testaments (Parts I & II) (2016)

Anthologies

Splinters

References

External links
Blog

Living people
Year of birth missing (living people)
English horror writers